The Dead Are Alive ( / The Etruscan Kills Again) is a 1972 giallo film by Italian director Armando Crispino, with music by Riz Ortolani, and starring Alex Cord, Samantha Eggar and John Marley. It was released in Germany as Das Geheimnis des Gelben Grabes (Mystery of the Yellow Grave), in France as Overtime, and in Spain as El dios de la muerte asesina otra vez (The Death God Kills Again). The film was produced by Artur Brauner and the story was based on a giallo novel written by Bryan Edgar Wallace.

Cast
 Alex Cord as Prof. Jason Porter
 Samantha Eggar as Myra Shelton
 John Marley as Nikos Samarakis
 Enzo Tarascio as Inspector Giuranna
 Carlo De Mejo as Igor Samarakis
 Horst Frank as Stephen
 Enzo Cerusico as Alberto
 Daniela Surina as Irene
 Vladan Milasinovic as Otello
 Christiane Von Blank as Velia
 Mario Maranzana as Vitanza
 Pier Luigi D'Orazio as Minelli
 Wendy D'Olive as Giselle
 Ivan Pavicevac as Policeman
 Nadja Tiller as Leni Schongauer Samarakis

Plot 
Two young people looking for a place to make love are brutally murdered in an Etruscan tomb which had recently been violated by a group of archaeologists, led by Prof. Porter (Alex Cord). The corpses are positioned so as to indicate they were murdered as sacrifices to the Etruscan Death-god Tuchucha. Several other murders occur, focusing on members of the archeology team and friends of Prof. Porter's. The victims have their heads bashed.

References

External links 
 

1972 films
West German films
Yugoslav horror films
Films directed by Armando Crispino
1972 horror films
Films scored by Riz Ortolani
1970s Italian-language films
1970s English-language films
English-language Italian films
English-language German films
English-language Yugoslav films
1970s Italian films
Italian horror films
German horror films
1970s German films